Alejandro Saravia may refer to:

 Alejandro Saravia (chef) (born 1983), Peruvian chef
 Alejandro Saravia (writer) (born 1962), Bolivian-Canadian writer